Patty is a surname. Notable people with the surname include:

Budge Patty (1924–2021), American tennis player
Sandi Patty (born 1956), American Contemporary Christian music singer